Edward Wutke (1902 - November 13, 1937) was an American sailor who was convicted by the United States Federal Government for murder. He was sent to Alcatraz Federal Penitentiary for 27 years for committing murder at sea and was assigned the number #47-AZ. Wutke was the first prisoner on Alcatraz during its period as a penitentiary to successfully commit suicide. He fatally sliced through his jugular vein with the blade from a pencil sharpener and was found dead in a pool of blood. Wutke died November 13, 1937.

References

1902 births
1937 deaths
American people convicted of murder
American sailors
Inmates of Alcatraz Federal Penitentiary
Suicides in California
Suicides by sharp instrument in the United States
Murderers who committed suicide in prison custody